The Ivy League Men's Basketball Player of the Year is a basketball award given to the Ivy League's most outstanding player. The award was first given following the 1974–75 season. There have been six players honored on two occasions: Craig Robinson, Kit Mueller, Jerome Allen, Ugonna Onyekwe, Ibrahim Jaaber and Justin Sears. No player has ever won the award three times.

There have been three ties for player of the year in the award's history: in 1981–82 (Paul Little of Penn and Craig Robinson of Princeton); in 1992–93 (Jerome Allen of Penn and Buck Jenkins of Columbia); and in 2019–20 (Paul Atkinson of Yale and A. J. Brodeur of Penn).

There was no 2021 award because the Ivy League canceled all winter sports for the 2020–21 season, including men's basketball, due to COVID-19 concerns.

Key

Winners

Winners by school

References
General

Specific

NCAA Division I men's basketball conference players of the year
Player of the Year
Awards established in 1975